John Fellowes may refer to:

John Fellowes, 4th Baron de Ramsey (born 1942), British landowner and agriculturalist
John Heaphy Fellowes (1932–2010), U.S. Navy captain, pilot, and prisoner of war during the Vietnam War

See also
John Fellows (disambiguation)
Fellowes (surname)